The 1926 All-Big Ten Conference football team consists of American football players selected to the All-Big Ten Conference teams chosen by various selectors for the 1926 Big Ten Conference football season. Herb Joesting and Bennie Oosterbaan were the only two players chosen unanimously in the Associated Press poll of conference coaches.

All Big-Ten selections

Ends
 Bennie Oosterbaan, Michigan (AP-1; UP-1; BE-1; WE-1)
 Roger B. Wheeler, Minnesota (AP-1; UP-2; BE-1; WE-1)
 William Flora, Michigan (AP-2; UP-1; BE-3)
 Chuck Kassel, Illinois (AP-2, UP-3)
 Jefferson Burrus, Wisconsin (UP-2; BE-2)
 Waldo A. Fisher, Northwestern (UP-3; BE-2)
 Laurie Apitz, Chicago (BE-3)

Tackles
 Spike Nelson, Iowa (AP-1; UP-2; BE-1)
 Leo Raskowski, Ohio State (AP-2; UP-1; BE-2; WE-1)
 Robert W. Johnson, Northwestern (UP-2; BE-1; UP-2 [tackle]; WE-1)
 Mike Gary, Minnesota (AP-1; UP-3; BE-3)
 Ray Baer, Michigan (AP-2; UP-3; BE-2)
 Leo R. Uridil, Ohio State (BE-3)

Guards
 Ed Hess, Ohio State (AP-1; UP-1; BE-1; WE-1)
 Bernie Shively, Illinois (AP-1; UP-2; BE-1; WE-1)
 Harold W. Hanson, Minnesota (AP-2; UP-1 [tackle]; BE-2)
 Bart, Northwestern (UP-1)
 John Lovette, Michigan (AP-2; BE-2)
 Louis A. Briner, Indiana (UP-3)
 John Lovette, Michigan (UP-3)
 Theodore R. Meyer, Ohio State (BE-3)
 A. L. Spencer, Purdue (BE-3)

Centers
 Robert Reitsch, Illinois (AP-1; UP-1; BE-2; WE-1)
 Alex Klein, Ohio State (AP-2; UP-2; BE-1)
 Ken Rouse, Chicago (UP-3; BE-3)

Quarterbacks
 Benny Friedman, Michigan (AP-1; UP-1; BE-1 WE-1)
 Harold Almquist, Minnesota (AP-2; BE-2)
 Franklin B. Lanum, Illinois (UP-2)
 Algy Clark, Ohio State (UP-3; BE-3)

Halfbacks
 Ralph Baker, Northwestern (AP-1; UP-1; BE-1; WE-1)
 Marty Karow, Ohio State (AP-1; UP-1; BE-2 [as fb]; WE-1)
 Nick Kutsch, Iowa (AP-2; UP-2; BE-3)
 Chester "Cotton" Wilcox, Purdue (AP-2; UP-2; BE-1)
 Louis Gilbert, Michigan (UP-3; BE-2)
 Byron Eby, Ohio State (UP-3)
 Vic Gustafson, Northwestern (BE-3)

Fullbacks
 Herb Joesting, Minnesota (AP-1; UP-1; BE-1; WE-1)
 Loren L. Lewis, Northwestern (AP-2; UP-2; BE-3)
 Russell Daugherity, Illinois (UP-3; BE-2 [as hb])

Key

AP = Associated Press

UP = United Press

BE = Billy Evans

WE = Walter Eckersall

Bold = Consensus first-team selection by majority of the selectors listed above

See also
 1926 College Football All-America Team

References

1926 Big Ten Conference football season
All-Big Ten Conference football teams